Hugh Alan Cornwell (born 28 August 1949) is an English musician, singer-songwriter and writer, best known for being the lead vocalist and lead guitarist for the punk rock and new wave band the Stranglers from 1974 to 1990. Since leaving the Stranglers, Cornwell has gone on to record a further ten solo studio albums and continues to record and perform live.

Early life and career
Cornwell grew up in Tufnell Park and Kentish Town and attended William Ellis School in Highgate, where he played bass in a band with Richard Thompson, later a member of folk rock band Fairport Convention. In the late 1960s, after earning a bachelor's degree in biochemistry from the University of Bristol, he embarked on post-graduate research at Lund University in Sweden. Not long after his arrival he formed the band Johnny Sox.

The Stranglers

Cornwell returned to the UK in 1974 with Johnny Sox (minus Hans Wärmling). Drummer Jet Black then joined the band.  At one stage it was just Cornwell and Black, who were then joined by bassist Jean-Jacques Burnel. Guitarist, keyboardist and saxophonist Hans Wärmling, on holiday from Sweden, joined the line-up towards the end of 1974. The Johnny Sox name was dropped, with the band adopting the name the Guildford Stranglers before settling on the Stranglers.

Wärmling was soon replaced by Dave Greenfield, who joined in 1975 after answering an advertisement placed in the Melody Maker magazine. Cornwell was the lead guitarist in the group and he also sang the majority of songs, with Burnel handling lead vocals on about a third of the band's songs. Years later, Burnel recalled that he often sang lyrics written by Cornwell, and vice versa, depending on "who had the best voice for that particular song."

By 1977 the group had secured a recording contract with United Artists Records. They went on to become the most commercially successful band to emerge from the UK punk scene, with numerous hit singles and record albums. He recorded his first studio album away from the group, Nosferatu, in collaboration with the Captain Beefheart's Magic Band's drummer, Robert Williams, in 1979. Cornwell's first solo studio album, Wolf (1988) was produced by Ian Ritchie with additional production on two tracks by Clive Langer and Alan Winstanley who had engineered the first three Stranglers albums and produced their fourth studio album, The Raven (1979).

In 1990 he decided that the Stranglers could go no further artistically. He recorded the album 10 with the band before leaving them after 16 years.

Post-Stranglers solo career

After leaving the Stranglers, Cornwell worked with Roger Cook and Andy West as CCW.  Their self-titled studio album was released in 1992,  with five of the ten tracks co-produced by Neil Davidge. Wired (1993), produced by Gary Langan (Art of Noise) with the exception of "Ain't It Strange", which was produced by Cornwell; Guilty (1997); Hi Fi (2000) (both produced by Laurie Latham). HiFi was released on 180g vinyl in 2020 through HIS Records Ltd with a new remix by Hugh Cornwell and a remaster. Footprints in the Desert released in 2002 is Cornwell's second "lost album" and compiles rare and unreleased tracks from the mid-1990s that were not part of a record deal. It was recorded in Bath with James Kadsky, who engineered the album Wired (1993).

Beyond Elysian Fields (2004) was produced by Tony Visconti. MusicOMH described it as "something like a cross between [Bob] Dylan and Dire Straits at their best...with a dash of Travelling Wilburys for good measure". Beyond Elysian Fields was released on 180g vinyl in 2020 on HIS Records Ltd.

In June 2008 Cornwell followed in the footsteps of Radiohead and Nine Inch Nails by initially offering his new album Hooverdam as a free download on his website. The album was recorded at Toe Rag Studios with record producer, Liam Watson. It was accompanied by a film, Blueprint, which depicted the recording process of the album. Cornwell explained that the film was partly motivated by the risible quality of the DVD's accompanying contemporary CD releases. Blueprint was described as "an engrossing film that borrows from [Jean-Luc] Godard's Sympathy for the Devil and [Norman] Jewison's The Thomas Crown Affair".

The studio album Totem and Taboo followed in 2012; engineered and mixed by Steve Albini, it was described as "Cornwell's finest and most unashamedly epic moment since the punk era". Prior to a Scottish tour that year The Herald wrote “The album yields its eloquent lyrical strengths on repeated listenings: stand-out tracks include the evocative A Street Called Carroll, Love Me Slender, I Want One of Those, a commentary on consumerism, and, unquestionably best of all, the atmospheric, nine minute noir epic, In the Dead of Night, which should become a live favourite. Cornwell's forthcoming tour sees him play the new album and the Stranglers' landmark 1977 record, No More Heroes, but Totem and Taboo is strong enough on its own.". A review on the Witchdoctor.co.nz website stated that "In a world or egotistic over-achieving and slack-arse under-achieving, Hugh Cornwell knows how to play it just right, and Totem & Taboo is a master class in sticking to your guns and doing what you do well".

In 2016 Cornwell collaborated with performance poet John Cooper Clarke to create the album This Time It's Personal, a collection of classic American and British pop songs from their youth. Cornwell had the idea that Clarke should apply his distinctive vocals to "MacArthur Park" and the project grew from there. Jethro Tull's Ian Anderson also makes an appearance on flute. The album was described as "a modern masterpiece from ‘Punk's Progressive Alliance’" by Louder Than War.

In 2018 Cornwell signed to Sony as a solo artist and released Monster. On this album, Cornwell sings about Evel Knievel, Lou Reed, Hedy Lamarr, Benito Mussolini, Phil Silvers and many more. The title track "Monster" pays tribute to special effects wizard Ray Harryhausen, of whom George Lucas said "Without Ray Harryhausen, there would likely have been no Star Wars". Aaron Badgley of Spill magazine wrote that "This is perhaps his strongest solo album since 1997's Guilty, and it might be even better than that album... Cornwell is a genius and Monster is just another example of his brilliant work."

Film, theatre, television and podcast
Cornwell has an interest in acting, and has appeared in a number of productions. In the early '80s, he appeared in Charlie's Last Stand with Bob Hoskins and Stephen Rea at the Almeida Theatre, London. He also appeared in the 1987 Peter Richardson film Eat the Rich, the award-winning BBC Screen Two series (successor to Play for Today) and in the 1995 BBC production, Rumble. He has also appeared in a number of videos and short films, including Bertrand Fèvre's L'étoile de sang.

Cornwell hosts Mr Demille FM, a podcast that takes his passion for film and explores it through interviews and episodes on careers and themes. Guests have included Debbie Harry, Brian Eno and Sir David Puttnam.

Cricket
A cricket fan, Cornwell appeared on the Jamie Theakston Cricket Show''' on BBC Radio 5 Live in 2001. He played a live acoustic version of "(Get A) Grip (On Yourself)" with the then England batsman and guitarist Mark Butcher. Cornwell subsequently became a player with Bunbury Cricket Club, and has been a guest on "A View from the Boundary" on BBC Radio 4's Test Match Special and BBC Radio 5 Live's Yes It's the Ashes.

Books
Cornwell has written six books:
 Inside Information (1980) tells of the time he spent in HM Prison Pentonville for drug possession
 The Stranglers – Song by Song (2001) guides the reader through all of the Stranglers catalogue
 A Multitude of Sins (2004) is his autobiography
 Window on the World (July 2011)  is a novel
 Arnold Drive, was published in 2014. It is a novel
 Future Tense, was published on 8 October 2020 by HIS.

Discography
Studio albumsWolf (1988)Wired (1993) (US title: First Bus to Babylon, 1999)Guilty (1997) (US title: Black Hair, Black Eyes, Black Suit, 1999)Hi Fi (2000)Footprints in the Desert (2002)Beyond Elysian Fields (2004)Hooverdam (2008)Totem and Taboo (2012)Monster (2018)Moments of Madness (2022)

Live albumsMayday (download: 1999, CD: 2002) Solo (1999) (*)In the Dock (2003) (*)Live It and Breathe It (2005) (selected highlights from People, Places, Pieces)Dirty Dozen (2006) (selected highlights from People, Places, Pieces)People, Places, Pieces - 3CD box set (2006)Beyond Acoustic Fields (2007) (live in-studio acoustic recording of Beyond Elysian Fields, limited edition to buy on tour only) (*) New Songs for King Kong - 2CD (2010) Live at the Vera - 2CD (2014)
Note: Albums marked with asterisk (*) indicate solo live performances; all others are band performances.

Compilation albumsYou're Covered (2011) (limited to 250 copies on Cornwell's 2011 tour, features covers of Cornwell's influences)The Fall and Rise of Hugh Cornwell (2015)

CollaborationsNosferatu (1979) – Hugh Cornwell and Robert WilliamsCCW (1992) – CCW featuring Hugh Cornwell, Roger Cook and Andy WestSons of Shiva (download: 1999, CD: 2002) – Sons of Shiva (Sons of Shiva are Cornwell and poet Sex W. Johnston (actually John W. Sexton))
 This Time It's Personal'' (2016) – John Cooper Clarke and Hugh Cornwell

References

External links

 
 
 
 
 Hugh Cornwell solo photo resource
 Hugh Cornwell interviews at www.strangled.co.uk
 Full discography
 PledgeMusic Totem and Taboo project
Mr Demille FM

1949 births
20th-century English male singers
20th-century English singers
21st-century English male singers
21st-century English singers
Living people
People educated at William Ellis School
Alumni of the University of Bristol
English autobiographers
English new wave musicians
People from Highgate
The Stranglers members
English romantic fiction writers
Lead guitarists
English punk rock guitarists
English punk rock singers
English rock singers
English male singer-songwriters
English rock guitarists
Male new wave singers
English male guitarists
Singers from London